Slavko Koletić (3 July 1950 – 10 August 2010) was a Croatian wrestler. He competed in the men's Greco-Roman 62 kg at the 1972 Summer Olympics.

References

1950 births
2010 deaths
Croatian male sport wrestlers
Olympic wrestlers of Yugoslavia
Wrestlers at the 1972 Summer Olympics
People from Petrinja